Gordon Gifels Field was a baseball ballpark in Stroudsburg, Pennsylvania that served as the home field for the minor league Stroudsburg Poconos of the North Atlantic League in the 1940s and 1950s.

References

Sports venues in Pennsylvania
Demolished buildings and structures in Pennsylvania